Náklo is a municipality and village in Olomouc District in the Olomouc Region of the Czech Republic. It has about 1,500 inhabitants.

Administrative parts
Villages of Lhota nad Moravou and Mezice are administrative parts of Náklo.

Notable people
Zdeňka Wiedermannová-Motyčková (1868–1915), women's rights activist
Jan Opletal (1915–1939), student, symbol of the Czech resistance against Nazism

References

Villages in Olomouc District